Théodore Salmon Cremnitz (13 July 1889 – 3 November 1980) was a French rower. He competed in the men's coxless four event at the 1924 Summer Olympics.

References

External links
 

1889 births
1980 deaths
French male rowers
Olympic rowers of France
Rowers at the 1924 Summer Olympics
Rowers from Paris